The 1999–2000 Essex Senior Football League season was the 29th in the history of Essex Senior Football League a football competition in England.

League table

The league featured 13 clubs which competed in the league last season, along with three new clubs:
Leyton, joined from the Essex Intermediate League
Woodford Town, joined from the London Intermediate League
Bury Academy, a newly formed club joined the league, before resigning on 1 October 1999 and seeing their record expunged

League table

References

Essex Senior Football League seasons
1999–2000 in English football leagues